Streptomyces cellulosae is a bacterium species from the genus of Streptomyces which has been isolated from garden soil . Streptomyces cellulosae produces fungichromin.

Further reading

See also 
 List of Streptomyces species

References

External links
Type strain of Streptomyces cellulosae at BacDive -  the Bacterial Diversity Metadatabase

cellulosae
Bacteria described in 1948